Pompeo Coronini (1581 – 14 March 1646) was a Roman Catholic prelate who served as Bishop of Trieste (1631–1646) and Bishop of Pedena (1625–1631).

Biography
Pompeo Coronini was born in Prebacina Gradiscutta in 1581. On 21 April 1625, he was appointed during the papacy of Pope Urban VIII as Bishop of Pedena. On 27 January 1631, he was appointed during the papacy of Pope Urban VIII as Bishop of Trieste. He served as Bishop of Trieste until his death on 14 March 1646.

See also
Catholic Church in Italy

References

External links and additional sources
 (for Chronology of Bishops)
 (for Chronology of Bishops)

17th-century Roman Catholic bishops in Croatia
Bishops appointed by Pope Urban VIII
1581 births
1646 deaths
17th-century Italian Roman Catholic bishops